Stephen Koch (born September 6, 1968 in San Diego, California) is an American adventurer, extreme snowboarder, mountaineer, and pioneer in the field of snowboard mountaineering, a term he coined. He is best known as the first and only person to snowboard on all Seven Summits, the highest peak on each continent. Koch is also the first to snowboard all the major Teton peaks in Wyoming. 

Koch has been featured in Outside, Men's Journal, and Sports Illustrated. Appeared on Late Night with Conan O'Brien, MSNBC and OLN.

He is an author of articles for Alpinist Magazine, Transworld Snowboarding Magazine, Snowboarder, Mountain Zone.com, Men's Journal Magazine  and American Alpine Journal. His photography work has been published in Men's Journal Magazine, Outside Magazine, National Geographic Adventure Magazine, American Alpine Journal, and Alpinist Magazine.

Notes

References

 Slave to the Quest May 1, 2003. Outside.
 Facing the Fall Line March 2, 2004 Outside.
 Late Night with Conan O'Brien 2003
 The Everest Ride March 17, 2003. Sports Illustrated.

1968 births
Living people
People from San Diego